Dalva Judith Peres (born 6 August 1996) is an Angolan handball player for Primeiro de Agosto.

Peres made its debut in the Angolan national team at the 2016 African Championship. As a youth player, she was a member of the Angolan youth team to the 2014 youth olympics.

References

1996 births
Living people
Angolan female handball players
Handball players at the 2014 Summer Youth Olympics
African Games gold medalists for Angola
African Games medalists in handball
Competitors at the 2015 African Games